Pichilemu Airport  is an airport serving Pichilemu, a Pacific coastal city in the O'Higgins Region of Chile. It is one of the oldest airports in the region.

It is currently owned by Club Aéreo de Pichilemu, on loan from the Municipality of Pichilemu as a commodate. It is used on certain occasions for events such as Presidential visits, and for emergency landings.

The Ministry of Public Works of Chile invested more than 300 million pesos (about US$750,000) to pave the  dirt runway, and it was inaugurated on 10 September 2011.

The length does not include an additional  displaced threshold on Runway 04.

See also
Transport in Chile
List of airports in Chile

References

External links
OpenStreetMap Pichilemu
OurAirports - Pichilemu
SkyVector - Pichilemu

Airports in Pichilemu
Airports in Chile